Bílý Újezd is a municipality and village in Rychnov nad Kněžnou District in the Hradec Králové Region of the Czech Republic. It has about 700 inhabitants.

Administrative parts
Villages of Hroška, Masty and Roudné are administrative parts of Bílý Újezd.

References

External links

Villages in Rychnov nad Kněžnou District